Hyloxalus utcubambensis is a species of frog in the family Dendrobatidae.
It is endemic to Peru and only known from its type locality near Tingo, Río Utcubamba drainage, on the western slope of the northern Cordillera Oriental.
Its natural habitats presumably are cloud forests.

References

utcubambensis
Amphibians of the Andes
Amphibians of Peru
Endemic fauna of Peru
Amphibians described in 1994
Taxonomy articles created by Polbot